Giorgio Boris Giuliano (October 22, 1930 – July 21, 1979) was a police chief from Palermo, Sicily. He was the head of Palermo's Flying Squad. He was killed by the Sicilian Mafia while investigating heroin trafficking and money laundering. Not long before his death he had been one of the first Italian policemen to have attended the FBI academy at Quantico, Virginia. His son Alessandro became head of the Milan Flying Squad and arrested old guard Mafioso Gaetano Fidanzati in 2009; as part of the same operation, Gianni Nicchi was captured in Palermo.

Early years
Before becoming a police officer he had many other professions: as a dishwasher in London, where he learned English, while studying at the university in Messina; as a seller of neckties in Milan; as the manager in a factory in Lombardy. As a boy he had lived in the Italian colonies of Africa, where his father served as an officer at the Italian Navy. In 1963, after entering the police, Giuliano was assigned, at his request, to the Flying Squad of Palermo. These were the years of what was called the First Mafia War between the Grecos and the brothers Salvatore and Angelo La Barbera.

In 1973 he became deputy police chief under Bruno Contrada, who had created the section investigating the Mafia. They were dubbed 'B&B', Bruno and Boris. Together, they radically changed investigating methods: two meetings per day with all the officials to take stock of the ongoing investigations and share information. (Contrada was later arrested and convicted for aiding and abetting the Mafia).

Giuliano was involved in the investigation in the disappearance of journalist Mauro De Mauro in September 1970. He focused on the lead of De Mauro's investigations into the death of ENI president Enrico Mattei, prompted by the disappearance a few pages of notes and a tape with the last speech given by Mattei from De Mauro's office. The investigations were seriously hampered due to deviations by people within the Italian police forces and secret services. According to Giuliano there was "someone at the ministry in Rome that does not want to go to the bottom of the death of De Mauro." An order to scale down the investigation was issued by the head of the secret service, Vito Miceli, allegedly involved in the neo-fascist Borghese coup.

Pizza Connection
In 1976 he became the head of Palermo's Flying Squad. During the late 1970s he was investigating drug trafficking by various members of the Sicilian Mafia including the boss Stefano Bontade, as well as a series of armed robberies linked to Corso dei Mille boss Filippo Marchese. Bontade was closely linked to the Spatola-Inzerillo-Gambino network involved in heroin trafficking since the mid-1970s until the mid-1980s when US and Italian law enforcement were able to significantly reduce the heroin supply of the Sicilian Mafia (the so-called Pizza Connection). The Bontade-Spatola-Inzerillo traffickers supplied the Gambino Family – through John Gambino – in New York City with heroin that was refined in laboratories on the island from Turkish morphine base. The investigation started when Giuliano found a suitcase at Palermo's Punta Raisi Airport with half a million dollars neatly wrapped in freshly laundered pizza aprons.

According to Giovanni Falcone, the investigating magistrate, the group had made about US$600 million. The proceeds were re-invested in real estate through the banker Michele Sindona. Giuliano discovered cheques and other documents which indicated that Sindona through the Vatican Bank had been recycling the proceeds from heroin sales by the Mafia to his Amincor Bank in Switzerland. He coordinated his investigations with the lawyer Giorgio Ambrosoli, appointed as liquidator of Sindona's banks, that had been declared insolvent due to mismanagement and fraud, involving losses in foreign currency speculation and poor loan policies. Ambrosoli was murdered on July 11, 1979 in Milan.

Killed by the Mafia
Ten days later, on July 21, 1979 Giuliano was shot dead in the Lux Bar in Palermo taking a cappuccino while waiting for his car to take him to work early in the morning. The material killer was Corleonesi boss Leoluca Bagarella. Bagarella shot Giuliano in the neck three times and, standing over the body, fired four bullets into Giuliano's back before making his escape.

Giuliano was investigating Bagarella after he had discovered his hiding place. Bagarella had managed to escape in time, but inside Giuliano discovered weapons, four kilogrammes of heroin and false documents with photographs depicting Bagarella. Bagarella, who had been arrested in June 1995, received a life sentence for the killing. The murder was sanctioned by the Sicilian Mafia Commission; its members Salvatore Riina, Bernardo Provenzano, Michele Greco, Francesco Madonia, Giuseppe Calò, Bernardo Brusca, Nenè Geraci and Francesco Spadaro also received a life sentence.

In popular culture
A miniseries was made in 2016 called Boris Giuliano - Un poliziotto a Palermo directed by Ricky Tognazzi where Giuliano is played by Adriano Giannini.

The Giuliano murder was also represented in Pif's 2016 series The Mafia Kills Only in Summer.

See also
List of victims of the Sicilian Mafia
Il Capo dei Capi

References

Sterling, Claire (1990). Octopus. How the long reach of the Sicilian Mafia controls the global narcotics trade, New York: Simon & Schuster, 
Stille, Alexander (1995). Excellent Cadavers. The Mafia and the Death of the First Italian Republic, New York: Vintage 
 has a chapter on Giulano's murder

External links
 Boris Giuliano: "un eroe semplice e allegro" Obituary on the site of the Italian State Police
 Boris Giuliano, un poliziotto all'antica, by Saverio Lodato, l'Unità, June 25, 2005

1930 births
1979 deaths
Deaths by firearm in Italy
Italian murder victims
Italian police officers killed in the line of duty
Male murder victims
People from Piazza Armerina
People murdered by the Corleonesi
People murdered in Italy